The Type 1940 torpedo boats were a group of 24 torpedo boats that were intended to be built for Germany's Kriegsmarine during World War II.  Although classed as fleet torpedo boats by the Germans, they were comparable to contemporary large destroyers. They were designed around surplus Dutch propulsion machinery available after the Germans conquered the Netherlands in May 1940 and were to be built in Dutch shipyards. Hampered by uncooperative Dutch workers and material shortages, none of the ships were completed before the Allies invaded Normandy (Operation Neptune) in June 1944. The Germans towed the three ships that were most complete to Germany to be finished, but one was sunk en route by Allied fighter-bombers and no further work was done of the pair that did arrive successfully. The remaining ships in the Netherlands were later broken up for scrap and the two that reached Germany were scuttled in 1946.

Background and design
Neither ship had had their propulsion machinery installed before the invasion and the Kriegsmarine decided to design a ship using them and taking advantage of surplus capacity in Dutch shipyards and factories. Although called torpedo boats by the Kriegsmarine, the Type 40 design was larger than any previous German torpedo boat design and were effectively destroyers.

Their hulls were divided into 13 watertight compartments and they were fitted with a double bottom that covered 90% of their length. Their crew numbered 231 officers and sailors.

Armament and sensors
The main armament of the Type 40 class consisted four 42-caliber  SK C/34 guns in single mounts with gun shields, two each superimposed, fore and aft of the superstructure, designated one to four from front to rear. Each gun was provided with 150 rounds. The Type 40s were equipped with a  rangefinder for the gunnery director atop the bridge and a  rangefinder was mounted just forward of No. 3 gun.

Anti-aircraft defense was provided by a pair of twin 80-caliber  SK C/30 anti-aircraft (AA) gun mounts that were positioned on a platform abaft the funnel. The ships were also fitted with sixteen  C/38 guns in four quadruple mounts, two on a platform between the torpedo tube mounts and a pair on the upper bridge wings. The gun had an effective rate of fire of about 120 rounds per minute. Each ship carried 2,000 rounds per gun.

The Type 40s were also equipped with eight above-water  torpedo tubes in two quadruple mounts amidships. The ships could carry 50 mines. For anti-submarine work they were fitted with four depth charge launchers and six individual cradles for 32 depth charges.

Construction
The Kriegsmarine ordered T61–T68 on 19 November 1940, although T65–T68 were only provisional orders that were finalized on 6 January 1941. A batch of four more, T69–T72, were ordered on 3 May and the final batch of twelve, T73–T84, on 27 August. The contracts for T67, T68 and T72 were transferred from Nederlandsche Scheepsbouw Maatschappij to other builders in September 1943 before construction began. The Kriegsmarine originally estimated that the first six ships would be assigned to the 3rd Destroyer Flotilla which was expected to be formed in early 1943. The destroyers probably had a lower priority for labor and materials than the large numbers of minesweepers being built in Dutch shipyards, so that the first ships were not laid down until 1942. The Dutch workers hampered construction at every turn, but shortages of brass, copper and aluminum were such that construction of all ships except for two was suspended by April 1942, even though steel and machinery for the first dozen had either been assembled or was in production. Supposedly eight ships had been begun by the end of the year; by mid-1944 the Kriegsmarine was expecting only four ships to be finished before the end of the year, another four in 1945 and the last four in 1946, the last dozen ships having been cancelled earlier.

T65 was the first of three Type 40s that the Kriegsmarine had towed to Germany for completion. She departed Vlissingen on 8 September 1944 and arrived at Borkum, a week later. The ship was in Bremen in October and was then towed to Elbing, East Prussia, in late December to be finished at the Schichau shipyard. After the yard was shut down on 22 January 1945 due to power failures, a lack of workers and the advancing Soviet forces which were approaching East Prussia, T65 was towed that day to Danzig and then back to Bremen. The incomplete ship was scuttled on 2 July 1946 after being loaded with chemical weapons. T61 was the next to leave, departing Schiedam on 12 September. Her convoy was attacked by Bristol Beaufighter fighter-bombers from No. 143 Squadron RAF that same day and she was sunk off Den Helder. T63 was towed from Rotterdam in November 1944 and arrived in Emden on the 29th and the Schillig Roads on 21 December. She was towed to Elbing for further work, but was towed back to Kiel in January 1945. Much like T65, the ship was loaded with chemical munitions before she was scuttled in the Skaggerak on 31 December 1946.

Ships

Notes

Citations

References

World War II torpedo boats of Germany
Torpedo boats of the Kriegsmarine